Rafael Antonio Vidal Castro (January 6, 1964 – February 12, 2005) was a Venezuelan competition swimmer, Olympic medalist and sports commentator.

Life 
Vidal was born in Caracas, Venezuela in 1964. At age 20, he became the first Venezuelan swimmer to win an Olympic medal in the 200-meter butterfly competition at the 1984 Summer Olympics in Los Angeles, California. Although he was one of the smallest men in the pool at 5-foot-11, Vidal was well ahead of West Germany's 6-foot-7 Michael Gross at the finish. However, one of Gross' elongated arms managed to touch the poolside first, robbing Vidal of silver. That heroic bronze-medal finish made him a national celebrity, with his image splashed on magazine and newspaper covers throughout Venezuela. His mark ranks him as the eighth of the top ten swimmers in the 200-meter butterfly of all time.

A year later, Vidal left Venezuela to pursue a career in administration and earned his bachelor's degree in computer and information sciences from the University of Florida in Gainesville, Florida, where he swam for the Florida Gators swimming and diving team in National Collegiate Athletic Association (NCAA) competition under coach Randy Reese from 1981 to 1985. Vidal was a member of the Gators' NCAA national championship teams in 1983 and 1984, and received six All-American honors.

After returning to Venezuela, Vidal was employed by a local television channel as a sports commentator and became a well-known television personality. In 1998, he founded Platinum with Cheche Vidal, a pioneer in the application of marketing in Venezuela.

Early on the morning of February 12, 2005, Vidal was killed in a traffic accident when another driver crashed his speeding Hummer into Vidal's car. The second driver was participating in an illegal street race. Vidal was 41 years old.

A "Million Meter Swim" (Un Millón de metros por Rafael Vidal) was held on February 12, 2006, at which more than fourteen million meters were swum by swimmers from Venezuela and around the globe. The tribute has been held every year since then.

Personal life 
On April 10 2017 his mother Flor Marina Castro de Vidal was found dead in her home by her daughter, apparently murdered by house thieves when she resisted robbery.

See also 
 Florida Gators
 List of Olympic medalists in swimming (men)
 List of University of Florida alumni
 List of University of Florida Olympians

References 

1964 births
2005 deaths
Florida Gators men's swimmers
Male butterfly swimmers
Olympic bronze medalists for Venezuela
Olympic bronze medalists in swimming
Olympic swimmers of Venezuela
Road incident deaths in Venezuela
Sportspeople from Caracas
Swimmers at the 1979 Pan American Games
Swimmers at the 1980 Summer Olympics
Swimmers at the 1983 Pan American Games
Swimmers at the 1984 Summer Olympics
Medalists at the 1984 Summer Olympics
Pan American Games bronze medalists for Venezuela
Pan American Games medalists in swimming
Competitors at the 1982 Central American and Caribbean Games
Central American and Caribbean Games gold medalists for Venezuela
Central American and Caribbean Games medalists in swimming
Medalists at the 1983 Pan American Games
20th-century Venezuelan people